is a Japanese comedy manga series written by Ranpu Shirogane and illustrated by Mamimu. It has been serialized online via Hero's Inc.'s Comiplex website since November 2019 and has been collected in five tankōbon volumes. A short-form anime television series adaptation by Gaina aired from July to September 2022.

Characters

A vintage pachislot machine who gains a human form, similar to Tsukumogami.

The grandson of the previous Pachinko hall owner, who passed away.

Media

Manga
Hanabi-chan Is Often Late is written by Ranpu Shirogane and illustrated by Mamimu. It began serialization on Hero's Inc.'s Comiplex online manga website on November 21, 2019. The first tankōbon volume was released on February 29, 2020. As of June 2022, five volumes have been released.

Anime
An anime adaptation was announced on August 7, 2021. It was later revealed to be a 5 minute episode television series produced by Gaina and written and directed by Hiromitsu Kanazawa, with character designs handled by Asami Sodeyama, and music composed by Tsukasa Yatoki. It aired from July 10 to September 25, 2022 on BS11, Tokyo MX, and AT-X. Crunchyroll licensed the series outside of Asia.

References

External links
  
  
 

Anime series based on manga
Comedy anime and manga
Crunchyroll anime
Japanese webcomics
Pachislot
Seinen manga
Shogakukan manga
Webcomics in print